Clastes is a monotypic genus of huntsman spiders containing the single species, Clastes freycineti. It was first described by Charles Athanase Walckenaer in 1837, and is found in Papua New Guinea and on the Moluccas.

See also
 List of Sparassidae species

References

Monotypic Araneomorphae genera
Sparassidae
Spiders of Oceania
Taxa named by Charles Athanase Walckenaer